Marie-Bernadette Mbuyamba (born January 5, 1993 in Courbevoie) is a French basketball player who plays for club USO Mondeville Basket of the Ligue Féminine de Basketball the top league of basketball of women in France.

References

French women's basketball players
1993 births
Living people
People from Courbevoie
Sportspeople from Hauts-de-Seine
21st-century French women